Letovo is a rural locality (a village) in Petushinskoye Rural Settlement, Petushinsky District, Vladimir Oblast, Russia. The population was 1 as of 2010.

Geography 
Letovo is located 27 km north of Petushki (the district's administrative centre) by road. Svintsovo is the nearest rural locality.

References 

Rural localities in Petushinsky District